Pseudohelotium is a genus of fungi in the family Helotiaceae. The genus contains about 50 species.

References

Helotiaceae
Taxa named by Karl Wilhelm Gottlieb Leopold Fuckel